Maximilian "Max" Reinthaler (born 22 March 1995) is an Italian professional footballer who plays as a midfielder for SV Wehen Wiesbaden.

Club career

Early career
Reinthaler was born in Bolzano, Italy. He made his debut on 6 December 2012 with Udinese in the Europa League against Liverpool. Although being part of the Serie A squad on several occasions, he never earned a cap.

In Summer 2013, Reinthaler had trials with both SC Freiburg and Red Bull Salzburg. However, due to compensation demands by Udinese, no agreement was reached. In order to evade Udinese's claims, Reinthaler regained amateur status by joining German sixth tier club TSV Gersthofen. While playing for Gersthofen he scored five goals in twelve appearances.

From April to July 2014, Reinthaler enjoyed a short spell at Swedish fifth tier club Rydaholms GoIF. In an interview he claimed that the offer he had received by Rydaholm had been too lucrative.

FC Augsburg
In July 2014, it was announced that Reinthaler had signed for German side FC Augsburg on a four-year contract, running until 2018. He was assigned to the second team, playing in the Regionalliga Bayern, but will occasionally train with the first team. He also takes part in the first team's training camp and first team's friendly fixtures. He made 24 appearances in the 2014–15 season, 17 appearances in the 2015–16 season, nine appearances in the 2016–17 season, and 18 appearances in the 2017–18 season.

Hansa Rostock
Reinthaler signed for Hansa Rostock on 18 June 2018. He made his club debut on 18 August 2018 when he came on as a substitute in the 89th minute in the first round of the German Cup against VfB Stuttgart. On 8 July 2020, Reinthaler extended his contract for another season.

FSV Zwickau 
Reinthaler signed a two-year contract with FSV Zwickau.

SV Wehen Wiesbaden 
On 1 July 2022, Reinthaler joined SV Wehen Wiesbaden.

Personal life
His hometown is Bolzano in South Tyrol, Italy. His first language is German.

Career statistics

References

External links
 

1995 births
Living people
Sportspeople from Bolzano
Germanophone Italian people
Italian people of Austrian descent
Association football midfielders
Italian footballers
Italian expatriate sportspeople in Germany
Udinese Calcio players
FC Augsburg II players
FC Augsburg players
FC Hansa Rostock players
FSV Zwickau players
SV Wehen Wiesbaden players
Serie A players
3. Liga players
Footballers from Trentino-Alto Adige/Südtirol